The All Nepal National Free Students' Union (Nepali: अखिल नेपाल राष्ट्रिय स्वतन्त्र विद्यार्थी युनियन, abbreviated as अनेरास्ववियु) is a political student organization in Nepal. The ANNFSU was founded in 2021. The ANNFSU is politically tied to the CPN (Unified Socialist).

It declares itself a legitimate and independent students' organization of all progressive, democratic and patriotic students of Nepal.

References

External links
CPN (US) website

Student wings of political parties in Nepal
Student wings of communist parties
Students' unions in Nepal
Communist Party of Nepal (Unified Socialist)